Luminescent Orchestrii are a gypsy punk band from New York City, whose music also incorporates elements of Middle Eastern, punk, and Appalachian music. The band's founding members were Sxip Shirey, Sarah Alden, Rima Fand, Julie Carney, Aaron Goldsmith, and Benjy Fox-Rosen.

Discography

Studio albums
The Luminescent Orchestrii (2003)
Too Hot to Sleep (self-released, 2005)
Neptune's Daughter (Nine Mile, 2009)

EPs
Carolina Chocolate Drops/Luminescent Orchestrii (collaborative EP with the Carolina Chocolate Drops) (Nonesuch, 2011)

References

Gypsy punk groups
Musical groups from New York City
Musical groups established in 2002
2002 establishments in New York City